Ferland railway station is located in the community of Ferland, Ontario, Canada. This station is currently in use by Via Rail. Transcontinental Canadian trains stop here.

External links
 Ferland railway station

Via Rail stations in Ontario
Railway stations in Thunder Bay District